Arisa Minamino (born 26 November 1991) is a Japanese professional footballer who plays as a forward for WE League club JEF United Chiba Ladies.

Club career 
Minamino made her WE League debut on 20 September 2021.

References 

WE League players
Living people
1991 births
Japanese women's footballers
Women's association football forwards
Association football people from Tokushima Prefecture
JEF United Chiba Ladies players